Gianni Polidori (1923–1992) was an Italian art director. He designed the sets for several films by Michelangelo Antonioni.

Selected filmography
 Bellissima (1951)
 Honeymoon Deferred (1951)
 The Overcoat (1952)
 The Tired Outlaw (1952)
 At Sword's Edge (1952)
 The Lady Without Camelias (1953)
 Love in the City (1953)
 I vinti (1953)
 We, the Women (1953)
 The Cheerful Squadron (1954)
 Marriage (1954)
 Le Amiche (1955)
 Rascel-Fifì (1957)
 Kean: Genius or Scoundrel (1957)
 Goliath and the Vampires (1961)

References

Bibliography
  Seymour Chatman. Antonioni, Or, The Surface of the World. University of California Press, 1985.

External links

1923 births
1992 deaths
Italian art directors
Film people from Rome